Eternal derby, also known as the Macedonia derby, is the name given to matches between the two most popular clubs from North Macedonia, the Skopje-based FK Vardar and Bitola-based FK Pelister, supported by Komiti and Čkembari respectively, with fans at times infamously engaging in hooliganism during the derby.
 
The rivalry can be traced back to the 1989–90 season and a match in Skopje, between FK Vardar and Red Star Belgrade. A conflict occurred between the "Skopje fans" and a few Bitola fans who went to cheer for Vardar, who at that time was the most popular Macedonian football club in the former Yugoslavia. On 5 August 1990 in Bitola, Pelister and Vardar met in the Yugoslav second league and the first incident occurred. From that day forward, started the big rivalry between Komiti and Chkembari along with the Vardar-Pelister match becoming the Eternal derby of Macedonia.

However, the rivalry is playing at the stands but not much at the ground because Vardar there are many more honours than a rival from Bitola. In a present time there is a small number of attendance and Pelister were many times and Vardar once relegated to the Macedonian Second League so the rivalry has lost its formerly importance. , there have been 68 derbies played in total since the establishment of the Macedonian championship in 1992, with Vardar winning 38 and Pelister 14 games, while 16 matches ended in a draw.

Statistics
The records does not include the awarded matches and a matches decided by a one goal difference.

Head-to-head 

Last updated on 3 December 2022.

Records

Record League win
 Vardar
 Home: Vardar – Pelister 7–0, Gradski stadion, 8 May 1996 (Karadzhov, Markovski, Nikolovski, Trajchev, Serafimovski, Stojkoski, Stanić)
 Away: Pelister – Vardar 0–2, Stadion Tumbe Kafe, 13 April 2003(Vasoski, Bozhinovski)
 Pelister
 Home: Pelister – Vardar 2–0, Stadion Tumbe Kafe, 4 April 2021(Manevski (2))
 Away: Vardar – Pelister 1–3, Gradski stadion, 26 April 2008(Peev – Miranda (3))

Record Cup win
 Vardar
 Home: Vardar – Pelister 4–1, Philip II Arena, 30 September 2015(Dashyan, Velkovski, Hambardzumyan, Grncharov – Nedanoski)and Vardar – Pelister 3–0, Gradski stadion, 17 April 1996(Shakiri, Serafimovski, Petreski)
 Away: Pelister – Vardar 0–2, Stadion Goce Delchev, 21 October 2015(Trajkovski o.g., Stojkov)

Longest sequence of League wins
Vardar: 7, 17 August 2002 – 11 October 2007
Home: 4, 23 August 2008 – 30 September 2012
Away: 6, 1 April 2001 – 29 April 2007
Pelister: 2, 16 March 2008 – 26 April 2008
Home: 3, 29 October 1995 – 14 March 1998
Away: 1

Longest sequence of Cup wins
Vardar: 4, 7 November 2012 – 21 October 2015
Home: 4, 11 April 2007–present
Away: 2, 7 November 2012 – 21 October 2015
Pelister: 3, 15 March 2000 – 25 February 2001
Home: 2, 15 March 2000 – 25 February 2001
Away: 1

Longest sequence of unbeaten League matches
Vardar: 15, 3 October 1998 – 11 October 2007
Home: 15, 24 February 1991 – 11 October 2007
Away: 8, 3 October 1998 – 29 April 2007 and 6 March 2013 – 4 October 2020
Pelister: 6, 1 April 2018–present
Home: 5, 7 November 1993 – 14 March 1998 and 16 March 2008 – 28 March 2010
Away: 3, 13 April 2013 – 23 April 2014

Longest sequence of unbeaten Cup matches
Vardar: 7, 4 April 2001–present
Home: 4, 4 April 2001–present
Away: 3, 2 May 2007–present
Pelister: 4, 1 May 1996 – 25 February 2001
Home: 4, 1 May 1996 – 2 May 2007
Away: 1

Bigger grade difference
 Vardar
 Point system 3–1–0: +44 (72 vs 28), 2002–03
 Pelister
 Point system 3–1–0: +18 (47 vs 29), 1999–2000

Official match results

Key 
 Colors

 Competitions
 SF = Semi-finals
 QF = Quarter-finals
 R16 = Round of 16

Results 

1 Vardar won 4–2 on penalties and won the one point.
2 Match suspended after 45 minutes (score: 0–0) due to the crowd trouble. Vardar were awarded a 0–3 win.
3 Match suspended before the kick-off due to the crowd trouble when Čkembari burned seats, collapsed the protective fence and clashed with the police. Vardar were awarded a 0–3 win.
4 The 2000–01 Macedonian Cup quarter-final tie was won by Pelister on away goals rule.
5 Pelister was played in the Second League in that season.
6 Vardar was played in the Second League in that season.
7 Pelister won 3–2 on penalties.

Players who have played for both clubs (senior career)

 Goce Aleksovski
 Jovica Anđelković
 Nikola Avramovski
 Almir Bajramovski
 Dejan Blazhevski
 Dragan Bocheski
 Radenko Bojović
 Zoran Boshkovski
 Vladica Brdarovski
 Antonio Bujchevski
 Saša Ćirić
 Matej Cvetanovski
 Mile Dimov
 Ilir Elmazovski
 Simeon Hristov
 Kire Grozdanov
 Marko Jovanovski

 Dragi Kanatlarovski
 Nikola Karchev
 Pece Korunovski
 Vlatko Kostov
 Blagoja Kuleski
 Blagoja Ljamchevski
 Borche Manevski
 Toni Meglenski
 Gorazd Mihajlov
 Petar Miloshevski
 Sasho Miloshevski
 Gjorgji Mojsov
 Zlatko Nastevski
 Tome Pachovski
 Igor Pavlović
 Zoran Paunov
 Oliver Peev

 Filip Petrov
 Mirko Petrov
 Jovan Popzlatanov
 Bogoljub Ranđelović
 Vasko Raspashkovski
 Zhanko Savov
 Stefan Spirovski
 Kire Sterjov
 Boško Stupić
 Goce Todorovski
 Milan Todorovski
 Kristijan Toshevski
 Aco Vasilevski
 Toni Veljanovski
 Dragan Veselinovski

Players who have scored for both clubs in the derby

Dejan Blazhevski (4 goals, 2 for Pelister and 2 for Vardar)
Saša Ćirić (2 goals, 1 for Pelister and 1 for Vardar)
Mile Dimov (2 goals, 1 for Pelister and 1 for Vardar)

Managers who have worked at both clubs
 Boban Babunski
 Ilija Dimoski
 Kiril Dojchinovski
 Perica Gruevski
 Gjoko Hadjievski
 Alekso Mackov

Honours 
These are the major football honours of Vardar and Pelister.

Head-to-head league ranking
The table lists the place each team took in each of the seasons.

Key

Source: rsssf.org

References

External links
Macedonian derbies article on MacedonianFootball.com

FK Vardar
Association football rivalries
FK Pelister
1990 establishments in the Socialist Republic of Macedonia